A fascinator is a formal headpiece, a style of millinery. Since the 1990s, the term has referred to a type of formal headwear worn as an alternative to the hat; it is usually a large decorative design attached to a band or clip. In contrast to a hat, its function is purely ornamental: it covers very little of the head and offers little or no protection from the weather. An intermediate form, incorporating a more substantial base to resemble a hat, is sometimes called a hatinator.

Etymology
The word "fascinator" is derived from the Latin verb fascinare ("to fascinate"), and simply means a thing or person that is enthralling or extremely interesting. Historically, the term was also applied to a person or animal with the (perhaps magical) power of rendering others unable to move or escape.

History

Earlier decorative headpieces
It was customary for Christian women in Europe to wear some sort of headcovering. The European fashion of decorating the female head with a round-brimmed headgear (or hat) can be traced back to the late Renaissance era of the 16th century when some rare Tudor bonnets appears to have a brim. Starting with the Baroque era of the 17th century, brimless head decorations developed. Queen Marie Antoinette made the fashion of using ostrich plumes as a head decoration popular among the European royal courts. Increased trade with Africa meant ostrich feathers were becoming more readily available to be used in fashion items, although this was still costly and therefore affordable only to the aristocracy and wider upper classes.

19th-century fascinators
In the mid-19th-century United States, the term "fascinator" was first applied to headwear. In this context, a fascinator was a lightweight hood or scarf worn about the head and tied under the chin, typically knitted or crocheted. The earliest citation identified by the Oxford English Dictionary for the use of the word in this sense is from an advertisement in the Daily National Intelligencer of December 1853. The fascinator was made from soft, lightweight yarns and may originally have been called a "cloud". The "cloud" is described in 1871 as being "a light scarf of fine knitting over the head and round the neck, [worn] instead of an opera hood when going out at night". The fascinator went out of fashion in the 1930s, by which time it described a lacy hood similar to a "fussy balaclava". Apart from the common terminology, these fascinators bore no relationship to the modern headpiece.

Modern
The use of the term "fascinator" to describe a particular form of late-20th- and early-21st-century millinery emerged towards the end of the late 20th century, possibly as a term for 1990s designs inspired by the small 1960s cocktail hats, which were designed to perch upon the highly coiffed hairstyles of the period. The Oxford English Dictionary cites a use of the word (in quotation marks) from the Australian Women's Weekly of January 1979, but here it appears to have been used in a slightly variant sense, to describe a woman's hat incorporating a small veil (in other words, a cocktail hat). However, the term was certainly in use in its modern sense by 1999.

Although they did not give the style its name, the milliners Stephen Jones and Philip Treacy are credited with having established and popularised fascinators in 20th-century couture.

Uses

Today, a fascinator is worn on occasions where hats are customary, sometimes serving as an evening accessory, when it may be called a cocktail hat. It is generally worn with fairly formal attire. In addition, fascinators are frequently worn by women as a Christian headcovering during church services, especially weddings.

A substantial fascinator is a fascinator of some size or bulk. Bigger than a barrette, modern fascinators are commonly made with feathers, flowers or beads.  They need to be attached to the hair by a comb, headband or clip. They are particularly popular at premium horse-racing events, such as the Grand National, Kentucky Derby and the Melbourne Cup. Brides may choose to wear them as an alternative to a bridal veil or hat, particularly if their gowns are non-traditional.

At the wedding of Prince William and Catherine Middleton in April 2011, various female guests arrived wearing fascinators. Among them was Princess Beatrice of York, who wore a piece designed by the Irish milliner Philip Treacy. The unusual shape and colour caused quite a media stir and went on to become an internet phenomenon with its own Facebook page. Princess Beatrice used the publicity to auction it off on eBay, where it garnered €99,000 for charity.

In 2012, Royal Ascot announced that women would have to wear hats, not fascinators, as part of a tightening of the dress code in Royal Ascot's Royal Enclosure. In previous years, female racegoers were simply advised that "many ladies wear hats".

Hatinator
The term "hatinator", which emerged in the early 2010s, is used to describe headgear that combines the features of a hat and a fascinator. The hatinator is fastened on the head with a band like a fascinator, but has the appearance of a hat, while a fascinator is much smaller and normally does not go over the sides of the head. The particular style of headgear favoured by the Princess of Wales, is sometimes described as a hatinator.

Gallery

See also
 Doll hat

References

External links

 

Headgear
Christianity and society in the United Kingdom
1990s fashion
2000s fashion
2010s fashion
Formal wear